Andreas Bluhm (born 21 December 1973) is a German former professional footballer who played as a midfielder.

Career
Bluhm started his senior career with Borussia Mönchengladbach in 1993, where he made six appearances. After that, he played for German clubs Alemannia Aachen and Augsburg and New Zealand club Football Kingz before retiring in 2001.

References

External links 
 Neuseelands Tor freute Bluhm "riesig" 
 Im Gespräch mit Rehatrainer Andreas Bluhm 
 Soccer: Kingz look to Lines, Bluhm 
 Andreas Bluhm: Borusse wechselt Seiten 
 Bild und Geschichte ... mit Andreas Bluhm
 Andreas Bluhm at Aussie Footballers

1973 births
Living people
German footballers
Association football midfielders
Borussia Mönchengladbach players
Alemannia Aachen players
FC Augsburg players
National Soccer League (Australia) players
Football Kingz F.C. players
German expatriate footballers
Expatriate association footballers in New Zealand